Mount Counts is a sharply pointed peak on the east side of Marsh Glacier marking the termination of the spur running west from Mount Rabot. It was named by the New Zealand Geological Survey Antarctic Expedition (1961–62) for Lieutenant Commander William D. Counts, U.S. Navy, a pilot on reconnaissance flights who was killed in a Neptune plane crash at Wilkes Station in November 1961.

Counts Icefall is also named for William Counts, who was assigned to Air Development Squadron Six (VX-6) at the time of the crash.

References
 

Mountains of the Ross Dependency
Shackleton Coast